Andaz may refer to:

Andaz (album), a 2001 album by the Pakistani rock band Junoon
Andaz (1949 film), a 1949 film directed by Mehboob Khan
Andaz (1971 film), a 1971 film directed by Ramesh Sippy
Andaz (1994 film), a 1994 film directed by David Dhawan
Andaz, a brand of hotels managed by Hyatt Hotels Corporation

See also
Andaaz, a 2003 film directed by Raj Kanwar